Hansda Sowvendra Shekhar (born 1983) is an Indian writer.

Life
Ethnically, Shekhar is a Santhal, one of India's Adivasi groups; this background is reflected in his fiction. His stories are rich in "fine details that add to the deep dimensions" and "open to us a world we have deliberately dismissed"  and contain "a surplus of understanding that comes from a kind insider-outsider." Indeed, he characterised his first novel as "the first full-fledged Santhal novel written in English, and published by a mainstream publisher." Born in Ranchi, Shekhar grew up in Ghatshila and Chakulia and went to school in Musabani. His parents used to work with Hindustan Copper in Ghatshila. By profession, he is a medical doctor and is employed as a medical officer with the government of Jharkhand, based in 2017 in Pakur.

Though Shekhar writes primarily in English, he also translates from Santhali to English  and Hindi to English.

Works
 The Mysterious Ailment of Rupi Baskey (New Delhi: Aleph Book Company, 2014) 
 The Adivasi Will Not Dance: Stories (New Delhi: Speaking Tiger Books, 2015) 
 Jwala Kumar and the Gift of Fire: Adventures in Champakbagh (featuring illustrations by Krishna Bala Shenoi) (New Delhi: Talking Cub - an imprint of Speaking Tiger - 2018)  In the year 2021, this book was reissued with a new title, Jwala Kumar and the Gift of Fire: The Dragon who came to Champakbagh. 
 My Father's Garden (New Delhi: Speaking Tiger, 2018) 
 Who's There? (featuring illustrations by Anupama Ajinkya Apte) (Chennai: Duckbill Books - an imprint of Penguin Random House India - 2020) 
 Sumi Budhi and Sugi (featuring illustrations by Joanna Mendes) (Bengaluru: Pratham Books, 2020)

Awards
For his debut novel, The Mysterious Ailment of Rupi Baskey, Shekhar won the 2015  Yuva Puraskar, was shortlisted for the 2014 Hindu Literary Prize and the 2014 Crossword Book Award, longlisted for the 2016 International Dublin Literary Award, and jointly won the 2015 Muse India Young Writer Award. The Mysterious Ailment of Rupi Baskey was named by The Hindu in December 2019 as one of the ten best fiction books of the decade.

For his second book, The Adivasi Will Not Dance: Stories, Shekhar was shortlisted for the 2016 Hindu Literary Prize. The Adivasi Will Not Dance: Stories was included by Frontline (magazine) in August 2022 in a list of 25 books “that light up the path to understanding post-Independence Indian literature.” 

Jwala Kumar and the Gift of Fire: Adventures in Champakbagh is Shekhar's first book for children. This book features illustrations by Krishna Bala Shenoi. It was shortlisted for a 2019 Neev Book Award in the category Junior Readers and a 2019 Crossword Book Award in the children’s books category.

His fourth book, a novel entitled My Father's Garden, has been called "rich and surprising" and "[packing] more emotion, detail and narrative heft than...books four times its size." My Father's Garden was shortlisted for the JCB Prize for Literature 2019.

Controversy
On 11 August 2017, the government of Jharkhand banned The Adivasi Will Not Dance: Stories and summarily suspended Shekhar from his job, on the grounds that the book portrayed Adivasi women and Santhal culture in a bad light. The key complainants appear to have been the ruling party in Jharkhand, the Bharatiya Janata Party; the opposition party, Jharkhand Mukti Morcha; and an academic at Jamia Millia Islamia. The government's actions were widely criticised. The ban on The Adivasi Will Not Dance: Stories was removed in December 2017 and Shekhar's suspension was removed and he was reinstated into his job in 2018.

References

External links
 
 

1983 births
Bengali writers
English-language poets from India
Indian male poets
21st-century Indian novelists
Living people
Adivasi writers
21st-century Indian male writers
Poets from Jharkhand
Novelists from Jharkhand